Maatr is an Indian thriller film written by Michael Pellico and directed by Ashtar Sayed. Michael Pellico is the executive producer under the banner CDB Musical. It features Raveena Tandon in the lead role alongside Madhur Mittal, Divya Jagdale, Shailendra Goel, Anurag Arora, Saheem Khan and Rushad Rana. Casting is by Rajesh Gautam. The music is created by a Pakistani Sufi rock band Fuzön.

The film's principal photography commenced in March 2016. The film is shot in Delhi and Haryana. The film was released on 21 April 2017. It emerged as a commercial success.

Plot
Vidya Chauhan (Raveena Tandon) is a school teacher living in Delhi with her husband Ravi (Rushad Rana) and teenaged daughter Tia (Alisha Khan). One night she is returning home from a school event that is an annual function with her daughter when she decides to take a deserted route to avoid a huge traffic jam. During the traffic jam, Vidya calls her friend Ritu and starts telling her about the school function; while talking on phone they met with an accident. Vidya and her daughter are kidnapped by the Chief Minister's son Apurva Malik (Madhur Mittal) and his friends who take the women to a farmhouse and gang rape them before dumping their bodies on the roadside. Tia dies as a result of the assault but Vidya survives. She names the CM's son and his friends as the attackers. However, those men use their influence to get away.

Vidya moves in with her friend Ritu (Divya Jagdale) after her husband leaves her. She decides to hunt down and punish her daughter's killers. First up is Sikander Beniwal. She loosens the screws on tyres of his bike causing a severe accident that kills him. She notes down the numbers and names of his friends from his phone. She finds out that one of the men, Inder Jhangra has been abusing Meenal, one of her students and Tia's friend. She helps Meenal poison Inder when he tries to abuse her in a hotel room. The inspector on the case Akhil Sachdeva is starting to get suspicious of Vidya but has no proof. Apurva Malik and his friends have also become suspicious. They beat up Ravi in order to pressure Vidya to back off.

One night Ritu takes Vidya out for dinner. Vidya doesn't know that the restaurant is owned by Harshit Poojari, one of the rapists who attacked her. When Harshit sees her on the CCTV cameras, he calls Apurva who tells him to hold her. He also calls his other friends before following Vidya to the bathroom. In the ensuing scuffle Vidya stabs him and manages to escape in a taxi. She is followed by Kamran Qureshi, Poojari's accomplice. Kamran rams his car into her taxi and shoots the driver before accidentally dropping his gun. Vidya grabs the gun and kills him before rushing home. Back home she tells Ritu the truth. Inspector Suchdeva comes to question her but leaves without getting anything out of her. Apurva's men beat up Ritu and she lands up in the hospital. Vidya decides to go after the rest of them.

She uses a fake name to set up a meeting at a building under construction with Sofi who is a property dealer. Once there, she holds him at gun point and makes him call Apurva and tell him that he is turning himself and the others in to the police. Sofi then jumps off the building and kills himself knowing that Apurva will kill him now. Sutti Mama who had driven Sofi there sees Vidya come out of the building with a gun in her hand and jumps into his car and drives away. His car is hit by a truck and he dies on the spot. Apurva finally tells his father to tell the cops to stop Vidya. But before they can do that, she sneaks into the CM's house during Holi and kills Apurva and his father before walking away.

Cast 
Raveena Tandon as Vidya Chauhan
Divya Jagdale as Ritu, Vidya's friend
Saheem Khan as Sub-Inspector Akhil Sachdeva 
Madhur Mittal as Apurva Malik
Shailendra Goel as Govardhan Malik
Anurag Arora as Inspector Jayant Shroff
Alisha Parveen as Tia Chauhan
Rushad Rana as Ravi Chauhan, Vidya's husband
Pranav Brara as Sofi
Amisha Sinha as Meenal, Tia's friend and schoolmate
Piyush Kaushik as Sikander Beniwal
Nitin Sharma as Inder Jhangra
Ishan Bhatt as Kamran Qureshi
Bhuvan Kaila as Harshit Poojary
Sutinder Singh as Sutti Mama

Soundtrack
"Zindagi Ae Zindagi"; Singer: Rahat Fateh Ali Khan
"Aisi Hoti Hai Maa"; Singer: Kavita Seth

References

External links
 

Indian courtroom films
Indian films about revenge
Indian thriller films
Films about rape in India
Indian rape and revenge films
2010s legal films
2010s thriller films
2010s Hindi-language films
Hindi-language thriller films